Matt Carthy (born 19 July 1977) is an Irish Sinn Féin politician who has been a Teachta Dála (TD) for the Cavan–Monaghan constituency since the 2020 general election. He previously served as a Member of the European Parliament (MEP) for the Midlands–North-West constituency from 2014 to 2020.

Early and personal life
Carthy was born in Birmingham, England, in 1977. His mother is from County Monaghan and his father from County Roscommon. The family moved to County Roscommon when Carthy was aged two, where he lived until he was 10. His family then spent a year living in Holywell in north-east Wales before returning to Ireland to live in Carrickmacross, County Monaghan.

He has described the experience of living on the Irish border during the conflict as playing a formative role in shaping his republican political views, and cites hunger strikers Bobby Sands and Kieran Doherty as major influences.

Carthy studied marketing for a year at the Dublin Institute of Technology, where he formed a Sinn Féin college cumann (branch) in 1996. Carthy was a founding member of Ógra Shinn Féin (a Sinn Féin youth organisation) the following year. He worked as a full-time youth organiser for Ógra in Dublin in Sinn Féin's party headquarters, and as a press officer for Sinn Féin.

Carthy lives in Carrickmacross, County Monaghan, with wife Lynn and their five children.

Political career
He was elected as the first Sinn Féin member of Carrickmacross Town Council in County Monaghan in 1999, becoming the youngest elected representative in the country (21 years old) at the time.

In June 2006, Carthy was elected as the first Sinn Féin Mayor of Carrickmacross Town Council. He was a member of Monaghan County Council from 2004 to 2014, and was elected mayor of Monaghan County Council in 2008.

At the 2014 European Parliament election, Carthy won 17.7% of first-preference votes. He took the third of four seats in the Midlands–North-West constituency. Former Provisional IRA member Thomas McMahon, who was convicted of the murder of Lord Louis Mountbatten and three others off the coast of Mullaghmore, County Sligo, in 1979, canvassed for Carthy in the elections.

In the European Parliament Carthy is a member of the Agriculture and Rural Affairs Committee (AGRI) and the Special Committee on Financial Crimes, Tax Evasion and Tax Avoidance (TAX3). He is a substitute member of the Economic and Monetary Affairs Committee (ECON) and Transport and Tourism Committee (TRAN). He was a full member of the Panama Papers Committee of Inquiry for its duration from 2016 to 2017.

In 2015, he was appointed as Sinn Féin's Uniting Ireland project coordinator. He has been party whip in the European Parliament since 2014 and has been a member of the Ard Chomhairle (national executive) at regular intervals since 1998. He was the Sinn Féin Director of Elections for the 2016 general election.

On 26 April 2018, Carthy was selected to run as the Sinn Féin candidate for the Cavan–Monaghan constituency at the 2020 general election, following the announcement by sitting Sinn Féin TD Caoimhghín Ó Caoláin that he would not be contesting the next election. Carthy was elected on the first count. Sligo County Councillor Chris MacManus was nominated to fill Carthy's seat in the European Parliament following his election to the Dáil.

References

External links
Matt Carthy profile on the Sinn Féin website

Matt Carthy's page on the VoteWatch website

1977 births
Living people
Local councillors in County Monaghan
Mayors of places in the Republic of Ireland
MEPs for the Republic of Ireland 2014–2019
MEPs for the Republic of Ireland 2019–2024
People from County Roscommon
Sinn Féin MEPs
Members of the 33rd Dáil
Sinn Féin TDs (post-1923)
Alumni of Dublin Institute of Technology